Joseph or Joe Scott may refer to:

Entertainment
 Joe Scott (musician) (1924–1979), American R&B songwriter, musician and arranger
 Josey Scott (born 1971), American musician, lead vocalist of the band Saliva
 Joseph "Lucky" Scott (died 1996), American bassist

Military
 Joseph Warren Scott (1778–1871), colonel in U.S. Army
 Joseph Francis Scott (1864–1941), American Medal of Honor recipient

Sports

Association football (soccer)
 Joe Scott (footballer, born 1900) (1900–1962), English footballer with Rotherham County, Barnsley and Tottenham Hotspur
 Joe Scott (footballer, born 1901) (1901–1972), English footballer with Sunderland, Darlington and South Shields
 Joe Scott (footballer, born 1930) (born 1930), English footballer with Luton Town, Middlesbrough, Hartlepools United and York City

Baseball
 Ernest Scott (baseball) ("Joe Scott", 1906–1947), American baseball player
 Joe Scott (baseball) (1918–1997), American baseball player
 Joe B. Scott (1920–2013), American baseball player

Other sports
 Joe Scott (walker) (1860–1908), New Zealand world champion walker
 Joseph Scott (bobsleigh) (1922–2000), American bobsledder of the 1950s
 Joe Scott (American football) (1926–2016), American football player
 Joe Scott (basketball player) (1916–1971), American basketball player
 Joe Scott (basketball coach) (born 1965), American basketball coach

Other
 Joseph Nicol Scott (1703–1769), English physician, dissenting minister and writer
 Joseph Scott (merchant) (died 1800), merchant and politician in Nova Scotia
 Sir Joseph Scott, 1st Baronet (1752–1828), English landowner and politician
 Joseph F. Scott (New York official) (1860–1918), New York Superintendent of State Prisons
 Joseph Scott (attorney) (1867–1958), attorney and community leader in Los Angeles, California
 Joseph Scott (police officer) (1901–1962), Garda Síochána and recipient of the Scott Medal
 Joe Scott (businessman) (1908–2002), American businessman, founding partner of the Philadelphia Flyers

See also